Platycheirus  is a large genus of hoverflies. They are also called sedgesitters.

Species

Subgenus: Carposcalis Enderlein, 1938
P. bertrandi (Kolenati, 1913)
P. confusus (Curran, 1925)
P. fenestratum (Macquart, 1842)
P. longigena (Enderlein, 1912)
P. lundbecki (Collin, 1931)
P. lundbladi Enderlein, 1940 - Juan Fernández Islands
P. stegnus (Say, 1829)
P. trichopus (Thomson, 1869)
P. willistoni (Goot, 1964)

Subgenus: Eocheilosia Hull, 1949
P. antipodus (Hull, 949b)
P. captalis (Miller, 1924)
P. clarkei Miller, 1921
P. cunninghami (Miller, 1921)
P. fulvipes (Miller, 1924)
P. harrisi (Miller, 1921)
P. howesii (Miller, 1921)
P. huttoni Thompson in Thompson & Vockeroth, 1989
P. leptospermi (Miller, 1921)
P. lignudus Miller, 1921
P. myersii (Miller, 1924)
P. notatus (Bigot, 1884)
P. ronanus (Miller, 1921)

Subgenus: Pachysphyria Enderlein, 1938
P. ambiguus (Fallén, 1817) 
P. barkalovi Mutin, 1999
P. brunnifrons Nielsen, 2004
P. dexter (Harris, 1780)
P. immaculatus Ohara, 1980

Subgenus: Platycheirus Lepeletier & Serville, 1828
P. abruzzensis van der Goot, 1969
P. aeratus Coquillett, 1900
P. albimanus (Fabricius, 1781)
P. amplus (Curran, 1927)
P. angustatus (Zetterstedt, 1843)
P. angustipes Goeldlin, 1974
P. atra (Curran, 1925)
P. aurolateralis Stubbs, 2002
P. carinatus Curran, 1927
P. chilosia (Curran, 1927)
P. ciliatus Bigot, 1884
P. ciliger Loew, 1856
P. cintoensis van der Goot, 1961
P. clypeatus (Meigen, 1822)
P. coerulescens (Williston, 1887)
P. complicatus (Becker, 1889)
P. concinnus (Snow, 1895)
P. coracinus Vockeroth, 1986
P. cyaneus (Müller, 1764)
P. discimanus (Loew, 1871)
P. europaeus Goeldlin, Maibach & Speight, 1990
P. fasciculatus (Loew, 1856)
P. femineum Curran, 1931
P. flabella Hull, 1944
P. fulviventris (Macquart, 1829)
P. groenlandicus Curran, 1927
P. hesperinus Vockeroth, 1986
P. hispidipes Vockeroth, 1986
P. holarcticus Vockeroth, 1986
P. hyperboreus (Staeger, 1845)
P. immarginatus (Zetterstedt, 1849)
P. inversus Ide, 1926
P. islandicus (Ringdahl, 1930)
P. jaerensis Nielsen, 1971
P. kelloggi (Snow, 1895)
P. kittilaensis Dusek & Láska, 1982
P. laskai Nielsen, 1999
P. lata (Curran, 1922)
P. latimanus (Wahlberg, 1845)
P. latitarsis Vockeroth, 1986
P. luteipennis (Curran, 1925)
P. manicatus (Meigen, 1822)
P. melanopsis Loew, 1856
P. modestus Ide, 1926
P. monticola Jones, 1917
P. muelleri Marcuzzi, 1941
P. naso (Walker, 1949)
P. nearcticus Vockeroth, 1986
P. nielseni Vockeroth, 1986
P. nigrofemoratus (Kanervo, 1934)
P. nodosus Curran, 1923
P. normae Fluke, 1939
P. obscurus (Say, 1824)
P. occidentalis Curran, 1927
P. occultus Goeldlin, Maibach & Speight, 1990
P. octavus Vockeroth, 1986
P. orarius Vockeroth, 1986
P. pacilus (Walker, 1849)
P. parmatus Rondani, 1857
P. parvus (Williston, 1882)
P. peltatoides Curran, 1923
P. peltatus (Meigen, 1822)
P. perpallidus (Verrall, 1901)
P. pilatus Vockeroth, 1986
P. podagrata (Zetterstedt, 1838)
P. podagratus (Zetterstedt, 1838)
P. protrusus Vockeroth, 1986
P. quadratus (Say, 1823)
P. ramsaerensis Goeldlin, Maibach & Speight, 1990
P. rufigaster Vockeroth, 1986
P. rufimaculatus Vockeroth, 1986
P. scamboides Curran, 1927
P. scambus (Stæger, 1843)
P. scutatus (Meigen, 1822)
P. setitarsis Vockeroth, 1986
P. speighti Doczkal, Stuke & Goeldlin, 2002
P. spinipes Vockeroth, 1986
P. splendidus Rotheray, 1998
P. squamulae (Curran, 1922)
P. stegnoides Vockeroth, 1986
P. sticticus (Meigen, 1822)
P. striatus Vockeroth, 1986
P. subordinatus (Becker, 1915)
P. tarsalis (Schummel, 1836)
P. tatricus Dusek & Láska, 1982
P. tenebrosus Coquillett, 1900
P. thompsoni Vockeroth, 1986
P. thylax Hull, 1944
P. transfugus (Zetterstedt, 1838)
P. urakawensis (Matsumura, 1919)
P. varipes Curran, 1923
P. woodi Vockeroth, 1986

Subgenus: Pseudoplatychirus Doesburg, 1955
P. glupovi Barkalov, 2007
P. peteri Doesburg, 1955

Subgenus: Pyrophaena Schiner, 1860 - often considered a full genus.
P. granditarsus (Forster, 1771)
P. rosarum (Fabricius, 1787)

References

Hoverfly genera
Diptera of Europe
Hoverflies of North America
Taxa named by Amédée Louis Michel le Peletier
Taxa named by Jean Guillaume Audinet-Serville
Syrphinae